St Mary's Church, Stafford is a Grade I listed parish church in Stafford, Staffordshire, England.

History

The church dates from the early 13th century, with 14th century transepts and 15th century clerestories and crossing tower.

Excavations in 1954 revealed the adjacent late Anglo-Saxon church of St Bertelin.

The church was collegiate when recorded in the Domesday Book when there were 13 Prebendary Canons. It became a Royal Peculiar around the thirteenth century, exempt from the jurisdiction of the Bishop, but this caused conflict and culminated in December 1258 when the new bishop Roger de Meyland came to Stafford with many armed men who forced entry and assaulted the canons, chaplains, and clerks.

The church survived as a collegiate institution until the dissolution of colleges and chantries in 1548.

Deans of Stafford

Post reformation history
For several generations the Aston family, who held the Scots title Lord Aston of Forfar,  acted as patrons, despite the fact that the entire family converted to the Roman Catholic faith in the 1620s. When the 2nd Lord Aston, who was very popular locally, died in 1678, hundreds of Protestants attended the burial at St Mary's  of a man they all knew well to be a Catholic.

The church was heavily restored by Sir George Gilbert Scott between 1841 and 1844.

Monuments

The church contains 
Chest tomb to Sir Edward Aston d. 1568
Wall tablet to Thomas (d. 1787) and Barbara Clifford (d. 1786) by John Francis Moore
Wall tablet to Humphrey Hodgetts (d. 1730)
Wall tablet to Izaak Walton (d. 1683)

Other burials

Edward Stafford, 3rd Baron Stafford
Walter Aston, 2nd Lord Aston of Forfar

Organ

The church has large four manual organ by Harrison and Harrison dating from 1909. It has been awarded a Grade I Historic Organ Certificate by the British Institute of Organ Studies. A specification of the organ can be found on the National Pipe Organ Register.

The second organ dates from 1790 when John Geib installed it at a cost of £820. It was rebuilt in 1844 by John Banfield, and then Hill, Norman & Beard in 1974. A specification of the organ can be found on the National Pipe Organ Register.

Organists
George Baker 1794 - 1810
Edwin Shargool 1841 - 1875
Inglis Bervon 1875 - 1880
Ebenezer William Taylor 1880 - 1904
John Cooper Green

See also
Grade I listed buildings in Staffordshire
Listed buildings in Stafford (Central Area)

References

Church of England church buildings in Staffordshire
Grade I listed churches in Staffordshire
Former collegiate churches in England
Former Royal Peculiars